High Society is a 1932 British comedy film directed by John Rawlins and starring Florence Desmond, William Austin and Emily Fitzroy.

It was made as a quota quickie at Teddington Studios by the British subsidiary of Warner Brothers.

Cast
 Florence Desmond as Florrie
 William Austin as Wilberforce Strangeways
 Emily Fitzroy as Mrs. Strangeways
 Tracy Holmes as Hon. Tommy Montgomery
 Joan Wyndham as Betty Cunningham-Smith
 Margaret Damer as Mrs. Cunningham-Smith
 Leo Sheffield as 	Lord Halkirk
 Syd Crossley as Simeon

References

Bibliography
 Chibnall, Steve. Quota Quickies: The Birth of the British 'B' Film. British Film Institute, 2007.

External links

1932 films
British comedy films
Films directed by John Rawlins
British black-and-white films
1938 comedy films
Films shot at Teddington Studios
Warner Bros. films
Quota quickies
1930s English-language films
1930s British films